Cavan was a parliamentary constituency represented in Dáil Éireann, the lower house of the Irish parliament or Oireachtas from 1921 to 1977. The method of election was proportional representation by means of the single transferable vote (PR-STV).

History
From 1921 to 1923, Cavan elected 3 deputies (Teachtaí Dála, commonly known as TDs). This was increased to 4 with effect from the 1923 general election, and reduced to 3 with effect from the 1961 general election to 1977.

At the 1977 general election, the Cavan constituency was combined with Monaghan to form the new 5 seat Cavan–Monaghan constituency.

Boundaries 
Throughout its existence, the constituency consisted of the entire administrative county of Cavan.

TDs

Elections

1973 general election

1969 general election

1965 general election

1961 general election

1957 general election

1954 general election

1951 general election

1948 general election

1944 general election

1943 general election

1938 general election

1937 general election

1933 general election

1932 general election

September 1927 general election

June 1927 general election

1925 by-election 
Following the resignation of Cumann na nGaedheal TD Seán Milroy, a by-election was held on 11 March 1925. The seat was won by the Cumann na nGaedheal candidate John Joe O'Reilly.

1923 general election

1922 general election

1921 general election 

|}

See also 
Politics of the Republic of Ireland
Historic Dáil constituencies
List of Dáil by-elections
Elections in the Republic of Ireland

References

External links 
Oireachtas Members Database

Historic constituencies in County Cavan
Dáil constituencies in the Republic of Ireland (historic)
1921 establishments in Ireland
1977 disestablishments in Ireland
Constituencies established in 1921
Constituencies disestablished in 1977